Annick Lanoë (born 1948) is a French film director, screenwriter and author. She has directed and written two films Les Nanas and Les Mamies. She is also the author of a number of books including Qui est sous ma couette.

She was born in Paris.

Filmography
 1985 : Les Nanas
 1992 : Les mamies

References

External links

1948 births
Living people
Film directors from Paris
French women film directors
French women screenwriters
French screenwriters